The 2021 Phillips 66 Big 12 Conference women's basketball tournament was a postseason tournament for the Big 12 Conference that was held March 11 to 14 in Kansas City, Missouri, at the Municipal Auditorium. Baylor won the tournament, its tenth title.

Seeds

Schedule

Bracket

*denotes overtime

References

External links
 2021 Phillips 66 Big 12 Conference women's basketball tournament Bracket (PDF)

2020–21 Big 12 Conference women's basketball season
Tournament
Big 12 Conference women's basketball tournament
Big 12 Conference women's basketball tournament
College sports tournaments in Missouri
Basketball competitions in Kansas City, Missouri
Women's sports in Missouri